The 2018 USA Sevens (also sometimes referred to as the 2018 Las Vegas Sevens) was the fifteenth edition of the USA Sevens tournament, and the sixth tournament of the 2017–18 World Rugby Sevens Series. The tournament was played between 2 and 4 March 2018 at Sam Boyd Stadium in Las Vegas, Nevada.

The tournament was won by the United States who beat Argentina 28–0 in the final. This was the first time that the United States won its home tournament. USA's Perry Baker led the tournament with 8 tries and 11 breaks.

Format
The teams were drawn into four pools of four teams each, with each team playing every other team in their pool once. The top two teams from each pool advanced to the Cup/5th place brackets. The bottom two teams from each group went to the Challenge trophy/13th place brackets.

Teams
Fifteen core teams participated in the tournament along with one invited team, the highest-placing non-core team of the 2018 Sudamérica Rugby Sevens, Uruguay:

Pool stage
All times in Pacific Standard Time (UTC−08:00). The pools were scheduled as follows:

Pool A

Pool B

Pool C

Pool D

Knockout stage

13th Place

Challenge Trophy

5th Place

Cup

Tournament placings

Source: World Rugby

Players

Scoring leaders

Source: World Rugby

Dream Team
The following seven players were selected to the tournament Dream Team at the conclusion of the tournament:

References

External links
Tournament Page

2018
USA Sevens 2018
2017–18 World Rugby Sevens Series
2018 in American rugby union
2018 in sports in Nevada
March 2018 sports events in the United States